
The Saser Muztagh is the easternmost subrange of the Karakoram range, in the Ladakh region of India. It is bounded on the south, east and northeast by the Shyok River, which bends sharply around the southeast corner of the range. On the west it is separated from the neighboring Kailas Mountains by the Nubra River, while the Sasser Pass (Saser La) marks the boundary between this range and the Rimo Muztagh to the north. The Ladakh Range stands to the south of the Saser Muztagh, across the Shyok River. 

Notable glaciers of the Saser Muztagh include the North and South Shukpa Kunchang Glaciers, the Sakang Glacier, and the Chamshen Glacier. 

Early European exploration and surveying of this range occurred between 1850 and 1900. In 1909 famed explorer T. G. Longstaff, Arthur Neve, and A. M. Slingsby explored the Nubra Valley and scouted approaches to the main Saser Kangri massif. However the main peaks were not climbed until the 1970s. 

Since this region is near the disputed border between China and India, there is currently little climbing and exploratory activity in the range, except for occasional forays by the Indian military.

Selected peaks
(This is a common criterion for peaks of this stature to be independent.) Note that they are all in the Saser Kangri group; the highest peak in the range outside of this group is an unnamed 6,789m peak.

See also
 List of highest mountains

References

Sources

External links 

 Maps of Ladakh, Bame Duniya blogspot, 19 March 2013
Saser Muztagh at Blankonthemap (French) 
NASA image taken from the International Space Station, which was initially misidentified as Everest

Mountain ranges of India
Landforms of Jammu and Kashmir
Mountain ranges of the Karakoram